Mick Weaver (born 16 June 1944, Bolton, Lancashire, England) is an English session musician, best known for his playing of the Hammond B3 organ, and as an exponent of the blues and funk.

Career
Weaver's band performed as Wynder K. Frog and became popular on the student union and club circuit of the mid 1960s. A brief merging of this band with Herbie Goins and the Night-Timers took his work to a higher level. Wynder K. Frogg — they are billed under this spelling — appeared on the bill at the Saville Theatre, London on 24 September 1967, supporting Traffic on their first UK presentation. Also on the bill were Jackie Edwards and Nirvana. The compere was David Symonds.

When Steve Winwood left Traffic to form Blind Faith, Weaver was recruited to replace him and Traffic became Mason, Capaldi, Wood and Frog, soon shortened to Wooden Frog. They played a few gigs before dissolving three months later when Traffic reformed. After this he recorded with solo artists such as Buddy Guy, Dave Gilmour, Joe Cocker, Eric Burdon, Frankie Miller, Roger Chapman, Steve Marriott and Gary Moore as well as Taj Mahal and The Blues Band, also playing keyboards with Steve Marriott's Majik Mijits.

Discography

As Wynder K. Frog

Sunshine Super Frog (1967)

Credits
All tracks featured Mick Weaver as Wynder K. Frog, playing a Hammond B3 organ and were recorded in London playing over backing tapes by unnamed session musicians from New York City. In the album liner notes Jimmy Miller noted that Weaver had "supplemented the band with trumpet, tenor sax, guitar, bass and drums, Wynder has transformed the organ into a highly enjoyable medium of sound, combining jazzy finesse with popular and commercial phrasing suitable for vast appeal".

Out of the Frying Pan (1968)

Credits
 Mick Weaver – keyboards
 Dick Heckstall-Smith – saxophone
 Neil Hubbard – guitar
 Alan Spenner – bass
 Chris Mercer – saxophone
 Bruce Rowland – drums
 Ron Carthy – horn
 Rebop Kwaku Baah – percussion

Into the Fire (1970)

Into the Fire was released only in the US, after the band had dissolved. Unlike the previous albums of mostly covers, the liner notes here state that the songs were, "composed specifically for the Frog style of musical interpretation, ranging far in beat, tempo and mood".

Credits
 Mick Weaver – keyboards
 Rocky Dzidzornu – percussion
 Neil Hubbard – guitar
 Chris Mercer – saxophone
 Shawn Phillips – guitar and vocals (on "Eddie's Tune" only)
 Bruce Rowland – drums
 Alan Spenner – bass

In 2018, RPM/Cherry Red Records released a triple-CD box set, entitled Wynder K. Frog. Shook, Shimmy and Shake. The Complete Recordings 1966–1970, including all the above recordings, plus 12 bonus tracks, previously unissued.  There were four on the second CD and nine on the third CD, and a 26 page booklet with extensive liner notes and photos. The bonus tracks on the second CD are: 14. "Jumping' Jack Flash" (Mono Version); 15. "Baldy"; 16. "Dancing Frog" (Stereo Version); and 17. "Blues For A Frog" (Stereo Version). On the third CD, the bonus tracks are: 9. "Happy Jack"; 10. "We Can Work It Out"; 11. "Funky Broadway"; 12. "Loving You Is Sweeter Than Ever"; 13. "A Memory Of Bruce"; 14. "The House That Jack Built"; 15. "I'll Go Crazy"; 16. "Tequila"; 17. "Baldy".

As a session musician

References

Bibliography
Joynson, Vernon. The Tapestry of Delights – The Comprehensive Guide to British Music of the Beat, R&B, Psychedelic and Progressive Eras 1963–1976. Borderline (2006). Reprinted (2008). 
Paolo Hewitt John Hellier (2004). Steve Marriott - All Too Beautiful.... Helter Skelter Publishing

External links

1944 births
Living people
English blues musicians
English rock musicians
English rock keyboardists
English session musicians
Progressive rock musicians
People from Bolton
Island Records artists
Fat Mattress members